Right Out of Nowhere is a studio album by American country artist, Kathy Mattea. It was released on September 27, 2005 via Narada Productions and was the fourteenth studio album in her career. The disc featured 11 tracks of original material, all of which were self-produced by Mattea herself. The album was developed from her own personal struggles that helped create a variety of musical styles onto the project. The disc received positive reception at the time of its release and charted on the American country albums chart.

Background
Kathy Mattea was considered among the "most respected female country stars of her era", according to Steve Huey of AllMusic. During the eighties and nineties decades, 40 of Mattea's singles reached the American country songs chart, four of which went to the number one spot. After nearly two decades of commercial success, Mattea left her longtime Nashville label in favor of the independent company, Narada Productions. Her first Narada project was 2002's Roses. 

Following the album's release, Mattea lost her father to cancer and her mother to Alzheimer's disease. During the same period, she temporarily separated from her husband, songwriter Jon Vezner. The pair reconciled and Mattea took her grief into the recording of her next Narada project titled, Right Out of Nowhere. According to Mattea, the album was built off an acoustic sound she developed from being on tour with her long-time guitarist, Bill Cooley. "It gave us a sound and a point of view, and we decided to make this record acoustically," she recounted.

Recording and content
Right Out of Nowhere was cut in a live format during a six-month time span. "We sat in a circle in the studio, and put mikes up and let things bleed through, and didn't worry about putting people in isolation booths," Mattea remembered. The album was produced entirely by Mattea herself at seven different recording studios: High Horse, Highlands Digital, King's Wood, Mick's Mix, Minnesota Man's Studios, Playground Studios and Pure Music. With the exception of one studio based in Charlotte, North Carolina, the album was recorded at studios in Nashville, Tennessee. A total of 11 tracks comprised the disc. The album featured three covers: The Rolling Stones's "Gimme Shelter", John Fogerty's "Down on the Corner" and the gospel spiritual "Wade in the Water". One track was co-written by Mattea, "Give It Away" (co-written with Bob Halligan Jr. and Jon Vezner). The song was based on a real-life event when Mattea met musician Keb' Mo' for the first time. Another track, "Love's Not Through with Me Yet", was based on Mattea's relationships that were "rebuilt from the ground up".

Release, singles and critical reception

Right Out of Nowhere was released through Narada Productions on September 27, 2005. It was originally distributed as a compact disc, but was later released to digital sites such as Apple Music. The album spent one week on America's Billboard Top Country Albums chart, peaking at number 73 in October 2005. To date, it is her lowest charting disc on the country albums chart. One single was spawned from the project: "Live It". The single was issued as a compact disc with two tracks: a radio edit and the original album version. 

Right Out of Nowhere was met with positive reception from critics and journalists. Thom Jurek of AllMusic rated the project 3.5 out of five stars and concluded, "Mattea is one of those singers who can do anything she likes; her emotive phrasing and willingness to stretch herself are commendable, and Right Out of Nowhere is one of her most ambitious outings yet." Matt Cibula of PopMatters gave the album a six out of ten rating. He found Mattea to resemble that of a folk singer rather than that of a country singer. Cibula praised the album's song selection and her vocals, noting a change in her vocal performance since her last album release. He concluded by saying, "Kathy Mattea is making me feel better in this shitty world. It’s a good record, it’s a clean record, it’s a pretty record." The Chicago Tribune noted Mattea's eclectic mix of styles in the album, saying, "Twenty years into her career, Kathy Mattea continues surprising audiences with her genre jumping."

Track listing

Personnel
All credits are adapted from the liner notes of Right Out of Nowhere and AllMusic.

Musical personnel
 Rick Blackwell – Bass, background vocals
 Suzy Bogguss – Background vocals
 Jim Brock – Body percussion (knee slaps), cajón, drums, percussion, performer (road case)
 Mick Conley – Toy piano
 Bill Cooley – Acoustic guitar, archtop guitar, bouzouki, dobro
 Jim Hoke – Autoharp, harmonica
 Randy Leago – Accordion, bass flute, percussion, sitar, Wurlitzer
 Paul Martin – Background vocals
 Kathy Mattea – Lead vocals, acoustic guitar
 Eamonn O'Rourke – Bouzouki, fiddle, mandolin
 Settles Connection – Background vocals
 Darrell Scott – Background vocals
 Randy Sharp – Background vocals
 Steve Slum – Steel guitar
 Carson Whitsett – Hammond B3 Organ, organ, piano, wurtlitzer
 Terry Wilson – Background vocals

Technical personnel
 Kristin Barlowe – Photography
 Mick Conley – Engineer
 Stephen Gause – Assistant engineer
 Ryan Jenkins – Assistant engineer
 Jimmy Jernigan – Assistant engineer
 John Mayfield – Mastering
 Kathy Mattea – Producer
 Rene Scheiderer – Photography (band member) 
 Chris Verespej – Design

Chart performance

Release history

References

Albums produced by Kathy Mattea
2005 albums
Kathy Mattea albums
Narada Productions albums